The Perth Reds 1997 season was the Perth Reds third and final first-grade season. The club competed in Australasia's Super League before being shut down at the end of the season.

Ladder

WCC Australasia Pool B

References

External links
1997 Perth season

Western Reds
Perth Reds season
Perth
Australian rugby league club seasons